Nik Muhammad Sharif Haseefy bin Mohd Lazim (born 30 March 1997) is a Malaysian professional footballer who plays for Terengganu as midfielder.

Club career

Pahang
Born in Kuantan, Pahang, Sharif began his career with Pahang academy or youth team before being promoted to senior's team in 2018. He made his professional debut on 25 June 2019, playing full 90-minutes, in a 2–5 Super League loss at away to Selangor F.C.

On 26 September 2020, Sharif made his first senior goal for the club against Kedah in Super League match with a 2–1 win at home. He made 10 appearances on the second season with Pahang and help the team with score three goals in the league matches.

Selangor
On 19 December 2020, Sharif completed a transfer from Pahang to Selangor.

Terengganu
On 30 May 2022, Sharif joined Terengganu on a half-year loan. On 27 December 2022, Sharif completed a permanent transfer to Terengganu, signing a two-year contract.

Career statistics

Club

References

External links
 

1997 births
Living people
Malaysian footballers
Sri Pahang FC players
Terengganu FC players
Malaysia Super League players
Association football midfielders
People from Pahang
Malaysian people of Malay descent